USNS Mission Los Angeles (T-AO-117) was a  that served in the United States Navy. The ship was originally intended as USS Conecuh (AO-103) for the U.S. Navy but her acquisition was canceled. The ship, a Type T2-SE-A3 tanker, was completed as SS Mission Los Angeles and delivered after the end of World War II. The tanker was acquired by the U.S. Navy in 1948 as USS Mission Los Angeles (AO-117), but was transferred to the Military Sea Transport Service upon its creation in 1949. The ship was named for Nuestra Señora Reina de los Angeles Asistencia (a "sub-mission" to Mission San Gabriel Arcángel, one of the twenty-one California missions), she was the only U.S. Naval Vessel to bear the name.

Service history

1945–1946
Conecuh was laid down on 25 April 1945 as a type T2-SE-A3 tanker under a Maritime Commission contract by the Marinship Corporation of Sausalito, California, but launched as Mission Los Angeles on 10 August 1945, sponsored by Mrs. Daniel J. Johnston. The ship was delivered on 29 October 1945. Operated by Los Angeles Tanker Operators, Inc. under charter, her period of service was short, for on 16 July 1946 she was returned to the Maritime Commission and laid up in the Maritime Reserve Fleet at Beaumont, Texas.

1947–1957
Acquired by the Navy on 24 October 1947 she was placed in service with the Naval Transportation Service as Mission Los Angeles (AO-117). Absorbed into the new Military Sea Transportation Service (MSTS) on 1 October 1949 she was designated USNS Mission Los Angeles (T-AO-117) and continued her services in support of the fleet until 12 November 1957 when she was struck from the Naval Vessel Registers and returned to the Maritime Administration to be laid up in the Maritime Reserve Fleet at Beaumont.

The ship was scrapped in December 1975.

Awards
During her active military service she was awarded the National Defense Service Medal, the Korean Service Medal (twice), the United Nations Service Medal and the Republic of Korea War Service Medal (retroactively). She also received two Battle Stars for her Korean War service.

References

 
 

 

Type T2-SE-A3 tankers
Ships built in Sausalito, California
1945 ships
Los Angeles
Type T2-SE-A3 tankers of the United States Navy
Korean War auxiliary ships of the United States